Manuel Mendes is a Portuguese paralympic athlete. He represented Portugal at the 2016 Summer Paralympics held in Rio de Janeiro, Brazil and he won the bronze medal in the men's marathon T46 event. In 2019, he qualified for the 2020 Summer Paralympics held in Tokyo, Japan after finishing in tenth place in his event at the 2019 London Marathon in London, United Kingdom. He competed in the men's marathon T46 event.

References

External links 
 

Living people
Year of birth missing (living people)
Place of birth missing (living people)
Athletes (track and field) at the 2016 Summer Paralympics
Athletes (track and field) at the 2020 Summer Paralympics
Medalists at the 2016 Summer Paralympics
Paralympic bronze medalists for Portugal
Paralympic medalists in athletics (track and field)
Paralympic athletes of Portugal
Portuguese amputees
Portuguese male marathon runners